Brooke Candice Nevin (born December 22, 1982) is a Canadian actress, best known for portraying Rachel on the science fiction series Animorphs (1998–1999) and as Julianne "Jules" Simms (2011–2012) on Breakout Kings. She also played Sonja Lester (2010–2013) on Call Me Fitz and was a series regular on USA Network's The 4400 (2004).

Nevin was born in Toronto, Ontario, Canada to Monique (Nicky) and Bob Nevin, a retired professional hockey player. Nevin has a younger sister named Kaleigh, and speaks French.

Filmography

Film

Television

Awards and nominations

References

External links

 

1982 births
Living people
20th-century Canadian actresses
21st-century Canadian actresses
Actresses from Toronto
Canadian child actresses
Canadian film actresses
Canadian television actresses
Canadian video game actresses